The Avenue (previously known as The Grand Avenue, The Shops of Grand Avenue and Shops of Grand Avenue) is an urban shopping plaza currently under renovation that spans three city blocks in the downtown neighborhood of Westown in Milwaukee, Wisconsin.

The Avenue has been the only major indoor shopping facility in the city of Milwaukee proper with the closing of Capitol Court in 2000 and the Northridge Mall in 2003 due to competition from newly renovated malls in nearby suburbs.

History

Grand Avenue opened in 1982 and hosted over 80 specialty stores, along with what was at one time the largest food court in Wisconsin.

The shopping center was named after a bustling merchant street during the 19th century, Grand Avenue (the portion of the present day Wisconsin Avenue west of the Milwaukee River). A main portion of The Shops of Grand Avenue encompasses the former Plankinton Arcade with many of its original features still intact including the statue of John Plankinton in the center of the circular atrium. The Arcade replaced the Plankinton House Hotel on the same site.

Grand Avenue was opened during a time when many downtown retail centers in major cities were shutting down.  It sought to avoid these problems by relying on locally owned shops that cater to the "urban" tastes of the nearby populace, in addition to the national chain-stores it houses such as the anchor T.J. Maxx. Because of limited street/surface parking, an adjacent south ramp provides hourly fee parking, costs heavily offset by mall purchase validation.

At one time, the mall also featured Marshall Field's (Gimbels until 1986) on the east edge of the mall, but the location closed in 1997.  The building that housed it, now ASQ Center, is still connected to The Avenue by a skywalk and features a Residence Inn, although it is not technically part of The Avenue. With the east addition of the downtown YMCA, their circling walking track has views down to Grand Plankinton Concourse through skylights.

TJ Maxx and Linens 'n Things were added in 2002.

In 2005, New York-based Ashkenazy Acquisition Corp purchased The Shops of Grand Avenue for $31.7 million. Due to the economic downfall and its impact on the Milwaukee metropolitan area, by 2009 the mall had lost many key tenants. In 2012 the mall was foreclosed upon and was put up for auction in October 2013. New York based real estate firm Alliance Capital Invest won with a final bid of $16.5 million. After struggling to improve performance, the mall was sold to a local ownership group for $24.6 million in December 2015.

On December 6, 2018, new plans for the existing space were announced as well as the space's new name, The Avenue. The former third floor food court will become office space for GRAEF-USA Incorporated. A new food hall will open on the ground floor named 3rd Street Market Hall, late in 2019. In addition, the 52 unit Plankinton Clover Apartments will replace some of the former retail space.

See also
Statue of John Plankinton

Gallery

References

External links 
 Official site
 The old Plankinton House Hotel and Oscar Wilde

Economy of Milwaukee
Shopping malls in Wisconsin
Shopping malls established in 1982
1982 establishments in Wisconsin
Downtown Milwaukee